Juicio Final (1992) (Spanish for "Final  Judgement " 1992) was a  professional wrestling supercard show, scripted and produced by Consejo Mundial de Lucha Libre (CMLL), which took place on December 18, 1992, in Arena México, Mexico City, Mexico. The show served as the year-end finale for CMLL before Arena México, CMLL's main venue, closed down for the winter for renovations and to host  Circo Atayde . The shows replaced the regular Super Viernes ("Super Friday") shows held by CMLL since the mid-1930s. This was the fifth third that CMLL used the name "Jucio Final" for their year-end show, a name they would use on a regular basis going forward, originally for their year even events but later on held at other points in the year.

The main event of the show was a Luchas de Apuestas, or bet match, which is considered a higher profile match type than a championship match in Lucha Libre. For the 1992 Juicio Final main event both Pierroth Jr. and El Supremo "bet" their mask on the outcome of the match. Pierroth Jr. defeated El Supremo two falls to one, forcing El Supremo to remove his mask and reveal his real name, Salvador Cuevas Ramírez, as per the Lucha de Apuestas stipulation. In the third match of the night, Javier Cruz and  Kato Kung Lee both put their hair on the line for the match. Cruz won and Kato Kung Lee was forced to have all his hair shaved off. The show included three additional matches for a total of five matches in total.

Production

Background
For decades Arena México, the main venue of the Mexican professional wrestling promotion Consejo Mundial de Lucha Libre (CMLL), would close down in early December and remain closed into either January or February to allow for renovations as well as letting Circo Atayde occupy the space over the holidays. As a result, CMLL usually held a "end of the year" supercard show on the first or second Friday of December in lieu of their normal Super Viernes show. 1955 was the first year where CMLL used the name "El Juicio Final" ("The Final Judgement") for their year-end supershow. Until 2000 the Jucio Final name was always used for the year end show, but since 2000 has at times been used for shows outside of December. It is no longer an annually recurring show, but instead held intermittently sometimes several years apart and not always in the same month of the year either. All Juicio Final shows have been held in Arena México in Mexico City, Mexico which is CMLL's main venue, its "home".

Storylines
The 1992 Juicio Final show featured five  professional wrestling matches scripted by CMLL with some wrestlers involved in scripted feuds. The wrestlers portray either heels (referred to as rudos in Mexico, those that play the part of the "bad guys") or faces (técnicos in Mexico, the "good guy" characters) as they perform.

Results

References

1992 in Mexican sports
1992 in professional wrestling
CMLL Juicio Final